The red-naped fruit dove (Ptilinopus dohertyi) is a species of bird in the family Columbidae. It is endemic to Sumba.

Its natural habitat is subtropical or tropical moist montane forests. It is threatened by habitat loss.

Identification 

A large, striking fruit-dove with a dark lower body, a cream-colored head, and a diagnostic conspicuous red patch on the nape. Juveniles show yellow fringes to upperparts feathers and greenish feathers on head and breast. Usually encountered singly or in pairs in the upper levels of forest in lowlands and hills.  Call is a low, disyllabic “wooo-hoo,” usually given repeatedly.

References

red-naped fruit dove
Birds of Sumba
red-naped fruit dove
Taxonomy articles created by Polbot